Darshan Gurung (born 20 August 2002) is a Nepalese former professional footballer who last played as a midfielder for New Road Team (NRT) and the Nepal national team.  In July 2022, Gurung decided to leave professional football and move to Australia. He made his international debut against Bangladesh on 13 November 2020 in Dhaka.

Early life
Darshan Gurung was born & raised in Ilam, Nepal.

Club career
In 2019, Gurung made his professional debut from Bhagwati Youth Club in 2019 Martyr's Memorial B-Division League(2nd tier league of Nepal), where he scored nine goals and became top goal scorer of the league.

In the same year, Martyr's Memorial A-Division League team NRT signed him as free agent. Gurung scored three goals and won Emerging Player award in the league.

In 2021, Gurung was bought by Dhangadhi F.C. for Rs.100,00 in auction for Nepal Super League.

International career
In 2017, Gurung was named in Nepal U-16 for AFC U-16 Championship qualification tournament. He made his U16 debut against Iraq U-16.

On November 13, 2020, Gurung made his debut for Nepal national team against Bangladesh in Dhaka as substitute replacing Ravi Paswan in 69th minute.

Career Statistics

Club

International

External links

Nepal90 profile

References

2002 births
Living people
Nepalese footballers
Nepal youth international footballers
Nepal international footballers
Association football midfielders
Nepal Super League players
People from Ilam District